Griffith Business School is part of Griffith University, located in South-East Queensland. It is a public university with more than 43,000 students from 131 countries.

Overview 
Griffith University is a public research university in South East Queensland, on the east coast of Australia. Formally founded in 1971, Griffith opened its doors in 1975, introducing Australia’s first degrees in environmental science and Asian studies.

The University is named after Sir Samuel Walker Griffith, who was twice Premier of Queensland and the first Chief Justice of the High Court of Australia. Sir Samuel Griffith played a major role in the Federation of Australia and was the principal author of the Australian constitution. Griffith Business School is accredited with the Association to Advance Collegiate Schools of Business (AACSB)—International, one of only fifteen Australian business schools to be recognised in this way.

Griffith Business School focuses on business and public sector education and research, with an emphasis on sustainable business development and responsible leadership. The school provides a range of undergraduate and postgraduate programs, as well as a substantial PhD program. The program portfolio includes Asian studies, government and international relations, public policy and public administration, tourism, sport, event and real estate management.

Academic departments 
The academic departments offer a range of undergraduate and postgraduate business programs. Areas include franchising, tourism, real estate and property development, international business, Asian studies and employment relations.
 Department of Accounting, Finance and Economics
 Department of Employment Relations and Human Resources
 Department of Business Strategy and Innovation
 Department of Marketing
 Department of Tourism, Sport and Hotel Management
 School of Government and International Relations

Research and Academic Centres 
Griffith Business School is home to several research facilities, in the fields of Asian studies and business, franchising, sport management, tourism, work and employment relations, as well as governance and public policy.

The school’s four research centres include:
 Centre for Governance and Public Policy — examining the capacity, sustainability and accountability of governments.  
 Centre for Work, Organisation and Wellbeing — developing research that is distinctive and relevant to the future of work.  
 Griffith Asia Institute — analysing developments in the politics, economics, societies and cultures of Asia and the South Pacific.  
 Griffith Institute for Tourism — producing research in tourism to effect both an academic and external impact.

In addition, 5 academic centres include:

 Asia Pacific Centre for Franchising Excellence — addressing the need for dedicated research and education in the rapidly growing franchising industry. 
 Asia Pacific Centre for Sustainable Enterprise — finding practical and integrated solutions to current sustainability issues.
 APEC Study Centre — one of two Australian member institutions in the APEC Study Centre Consortium (ASCC), based in the Griffith Asia Institute.
 Griffith Centre for Personal Finance and Superannuation — producing research in personal finance and superannuation, for both academic and external impact.
 Social Marketing @ Griffith — influencing behaviour that benefits individuals and communities for the greater social good.

Accreditation and Professional Associations 
Griffith Business School has many industry partnerships, including a range of professional connections and accreditations. These include:
 Association of Chartered Certified Accountants 
 Australian Human Resources Institute  
 Australian Marketing Institute
 Australian Securities and Investments Commission  
 CPA Australia 
 Chartered Institute of Purchasing and Supply  
 Financial Planning Association of Australia 
 Financial Services Institute of Australasia  
 Institute of Chartered Accountants in Australia  
 International Centre of Excellence in Tourism and Hospitality Education

MBA 
The Griffith MBA is ranked among Australia's leading MBA programs in CEO Magazine and its 2017 MBA Rankings. The rankings are compiled by the International Graduate Forum and are designed to present a 360-degree view of the world’s leading business schools. The Griffith MBA is placed sixth in the top tier of Australian programs, and is the only Queensland program to feature in the top 10. It also features in the magazine’s top 20 Global MBA Rankings.

The MBA program was awarded the top rating of five stars with the Graduate Management Association of Australia (GMAA) 5-star rankings. The MBA retained its #4 position among the Top 5 MBA programs in Australia as per the 2017 Australian Financial Review (AFR) BOSS Magazine MBA survey. This Australian MBA ranking is conducted every two years and is largely based on the feedback of recent alumni.

References

External links 
 Griffith Business School
 Griffith University

Griffith University
Business schools in Australia